God of Cricket is a 2021 Bollywood biopic sports film. The film was released on 24 April 2021. Directed by Sudesh Kanojia and co-produced by Vinay Bhardwaj and Pranav Jain, the film features Sangram Singh as a cricketer in lead among others.

It revolves around the fictional events with a chronicle documentary of Sachin Tendulkar, a former Indian cricketer often recognized for his highest scored runs in international cricket.

Plot 
The epic sports film revolves around a teenager who works as a hockey coach, despite his parents wanted him to choose cricket over hockey. He subsequently writes a letter to Sachin Tendulkar.

Production 
In association with Chand Jannat Films along with Yellowstone Studios, it is produced under the banner of Shining Sun Studios. The development of film production is intended to acclaim Tendulkar's contribution to the first-class cricket.

References 

2020s biographical films
2020s sports films
2021 films
Biographical films about sportspeople
Films about cricket in India
Indian films based on actual events